Aurélien Bellanger, (born 20 April 1980 in Laval, Mayenne), is a French writer and actor. He debuted in 2010 with a monograph about Michel Houellebecq and has since published novels on a regular basis. His second novel, L'Aménagement du territoire, received the 2014 Prix de Flore. Due to his occupation with technology and modern life, his novels have been compared to the works of Houellebecq and Honoré de Balzac. In La Croix, 
Sabine Audrerie notes
"If we had to look for a link, we could retain the desire to be part of the Balzacie heritage."
Less elogious, Jérôme Dupuis of L'Express described him as "a Houellebecq without humour, without sex, without aphorism, without melancholy".

Literary works
 Houellebecq écrivain romantique (2010), éditions Léo Scheer, monograph
 La Théorie de l'information (2012), éditions Gallimard, novel
 L'Aménagement du territoire (2014), éditions Gallimard, novel
 Le Grand Paris (2017), éditions Gallimard, novel
 Le Continent de la douceur (2019), éditions Gallimard, novel
 Téléréalité (2021), éditions Gallimard, novel
 Le vingtième siècle (2023), éditions Gallimard, novel

Filmography
 Vilaine Fille, mauvais garçon (2011)
 Agit pop (2011)
 Age of Panic (La Bataille de Solférino) (2013)

References

External links

 Aurélien Bellanger at Gallimard.fr 

1980 births
French male film actors
French non-fiction writers
21st-century French novelists
Living people
People from Laval, Mayenne
21st-century French male actors
French male novelists
21st-century French male writers
French male non-fiction writers